Reginald Lawrence Knowles (11 November 1911 – 23 December 1995), better known as Patric Knowles, was an English film actor. Born in Horsforth, West Riding of Yorkshire, he made his film debut in 1932, and played either first or second film leads throughout his career. He appeared in films from the 1930s to the 1970s.

Life and career

Early life
On 11 November 1911, Reginald Lawrence Knowles was born in Milton College, Horsforth. Knowles was persistent in following his dreams as an actor and ran away from home at the age of 14, but was brought back. He ran away again in later years, which proved to be more successful.

British acting career
Knowles began his acting career with the British sound films early in 1932, calling himself Patric Knowles. He made his film debut in Men of Tomorrow (1932), produced by Alexander Korda.

He later joined the repertory group of the Oxford Playhouse theater and began touring with various companies and was involved in some seasons in regional theater, being featured in 14 British films, including The Poisoned Diamond (1933), directed by W. P. Kellino; Norah O'Neale (1934), directed by Brian Desmond Hurst; Regal Cavalcade (1935); and The Girl in the Crowd (1935), directed by Michael Powell.

He had the male lead in The Student's Romance (1935) with Grete Natzler and Honours Easy (1935) with Greta Nissen and was in Abdul the Damned (1935), Mister Hobo (1935) with George Arliss, Wrath of Jealousy (1936), and Two's Company (1936).

During the same time, Knowles met Gladys Enid Percival, an actress and homemaker, and married the 23-year-old on 3 October 1935.

After a few tours Knowles went to London and appeared in By Appointment in 1936, where he was spotted by Irving Asher of Warner Bros. and got a Hollywood contract for more than 2 years. He had the lead in his final British films, The Brown Wallet (1936), directed by Powell; Fair Exchange (1936), directed by Ralph Ince; and Crown v. Stevens (1936), directed by Powell.

Warner Bros
In 1936 he arrived in New York alongside his wife and appeared in his first American film, Give Me Your Heart (1936) with Kay Francis, released in Great Britain as Sweet Aloes, Knowles was cast as a titled Englishman of means.

In 1939 and at the age of 27, Knowles moved to his new residence with his wife in Tarzana, Los Angeles, California, USA. During his free time Knowles became a licensed private pilot in the late 1930s.

His second film for Warners was The Charge of the Light Brigade (1936), where he played the younger brother of Errol Flynn, who was loved by Olivia de Havilland. (Errol Flynn and Knowles closely resembled each other physically to the point of being referred to as "look-alikes.") Knowles returned to England to make Irish for Luck (1936), and then supported Bette Davis in It's Love I'm After (1937).

Knowles was top billed in some B pictures at Warners, Expensive Husbands (1937) and The Patient in Room 18 (1938). He was reteamed with Flynn and De Havilland in The Adventures of Robin Hood (1938), playing Will Scarlett, and again with the pair in Four's a Crowd (1938). He supported Flynn and Bette Davis in The Sisters (1938).

Republic borrowed Knowles to play the lead in Storm Over Bengal (1938).

At Warners he had support roles in two B pictures, Heart of the North (1938) and Torchy Blane in Chinatown (1939), then he left the studio.

RKO

Knowles signed a contract at RKO, for whom he made Beauty for the Asking (1939) with Lucille Ball; Five Came Back (1939) also with Ball, directed by John Farrow; and The Spellbinder (1939).

He went to MGM for Another Thin Man (1939) with William Powell and Myrna Loy and Fox for The Honeymoon's Over (1939) then went back to RKO for two more with John Farrow, Married and in Love (1940) and a remake of A Bill of Divorcement (1940) with Maureen O'Hara and Adolphe Menjou, then Anne of Windy Poplars (1941), playing Gilbert Blythe.

In 1940 a limerick circulated about Knowles:  How pleasant to know Patric Knowles/ Who is the kindest of souls/ But being handsome and a British swell/ Nobody expects him to act very well/ Which is why he never gets good roles.

World War II
In 1940 Knowles left Hollywood and travelled to Canada to enlist in the Royal Canadian Air Force. He had hundreds of hours of flying experience but an eye ailment meant he became an instructor.

At Fox he was in How Green Was My Valley (1941) for John Ford.

Universal

Knowles went to Universal for a support part in The Wolf Man (1941) with Lon Chaney Jr. and Claude Rains. He went to Republic for Women in War (1941) then was top billed in Universal's The Strange Case of Doctor Rx (1942), and Mystery of Marie Roget (1942) with Maria Montez.

He supported Irene Dunne in Gregory La Cava's Lady in a Jam (1942) with Ralph Bellamy and Eugene Pallette, Constance Bennett in Sin Town (1942), Abbott and Costello in Who Done It? (1942) and Hit the Ice (1943), Ilona Massey in Frankenstein Meets the Wolf Man (1943) with Lon Chaney Jr. and Bela Lugosi, Rosemary Lane in All by Myself (1943), The Andrews Sisters in Always a Bridesmaid (1943), Olsen and Johnson in Crazy House (1943), Donald O'Connor and Peggy Ryan in Chip Off the Old Block (1944) and This Is the Life (1944), and Gloria Jean in Pardon My Rhythm (1944).

During this time he continued to serve as a flying instructor with the US Air Force.

Paramount

Knowles went to Paramount where he supported Paulette Goddard and Ray Milland in Kitty (1945), Dorothy Lamour in Masquerade in Mexico (1945), Barbara Stanwyck in The Bride Wore Boots (1946), and Alan Ladd in O.S.S. (1946).

He went to Warners for Of Human Bondage (1946) and Universal borrowed him to play Joan Fontaine's leading man in the thriller Ivy (1947). He went back to Paramount for Monsieur Beaucaire (1946) with Bob Hope, Variety Girl (1947) with practically every performer on the Paramount lot, Dream Girl (1948), and Isn't It Romantic? (1949).

Knowles went to RKO for The Big Steal (1949) with Robert Mitchum, Jane Greer and William Bendix, and Fox for Three Came Home (1950), second billed, playing Claudette Colbert's husband.

Television

Knowles began appearing on TV shows such as The Bigelow Theatre, Studio One in Hollywood, Lights Out, Hollywood Opening Night, Robert Montgomery Presents, The Revlon Mirror Theater, The United States Steel Hour, The Whistler, Studio 57, The Ford Television Theatre, and Jane Wyman Presents The Fireside Theatre.

He still appeared in features such as Quebec (1951), Mutiny (1952), Tarzan's Savage Fury (1952) (as the villain), Jamaica Run (1953), Flame of Calcutta (1953) for Sam Katzman (second billed to Denise Darcel), World for Ransom (1954), Khyber Patrol (1954) and No Man's Woman (1955).

From the late 1950s Knowles became an almost exclusively television actor appearing in Star Stage, The 20th Century-Fox Hour, Tales of the 77th Bengal Lancers , Ethel Barrymore Theatre, Lux Video Theatre, Matinee Theatre, Schlitz Playhouse, The Millionaire, Lux Playhouse, Walt Disney's Wonderful World of Color, Wagon Train, General Electric Theater, 77 Sunset Strip, Tightrope, Maverick in episodes "The Wrecker" with James Garner and Jack Kelly and "Guatemala City" with James Garner, The Barbara Stanwyck Show, Klondike, The Jim Backus Show, Death Valley Days, The Islanders, Checkmate, Peter Gunn, Whispering Smith, Hawaiian Eye, Have Gun – Will Travel (as Phileas Fogg in the episode "Foggbound", and as August in “Savages”) with Richard Boone, Gunsmoke, The Rogues, Mickey with Mickey Rooney, and Jericho.

He had a small role in the feature Band of Angels (1957) with Clark Gable and Sidney Portier, From the Earth to the Moon (1958) and Auntie Mame (1958) with Rosalind Russell.

He wrote a novel, Even Steven (Vantage Press, 1960, ASIN B0006RMC2G).

Later career
Knowles' later appearances included television guest star roles on Family Affair, Garrison's Gorillas,  and Marcus Welby, M.D.. He appeared in three films for director Andrew McLaglen,The Way West (1967) with Kirk Douglas and Robert Mitchum, as Lord Mountbatten in The Devil's Brigade (1968) with William Holden and Cliff Robertson, and as John Tunstall in Chisum (1970) with John Wayne. He also appeared in In Enemy Country (1968) with Tony Franciosa, D.A.: Murder One (1969),  Getting Together (1971),  The Man (1972) with James Earl Jones, Terror in the Wax Museum (1973) with Ray Milland and Elsa Lanchester, and Arnold (1973) with Stella Stevens.

Knowles was inducted into the Hollywood Walk of Fame.

Death
Knowles died at age 84 from a brain hemorrhage at West Hills Hospital in West Hills, California on 23 December 1995.

Partial filmography

References

Further reading

External links

 

1911 births
1995 deaths
English male film actors
English male television actors
People from Horsforth
Royal Canadian Air Force personnel of World War II
Warner Bros. contract players
20th-century English male actors
British expatriate male actors in the United States
Canadian World War II pilots